Fassawa Camara (born January 10, 1983) is a Guinean-born Indonesian former footballer who last played as a midfielder for Liga 2 club Martapura.

Career

Martapura
He was signed for Martapura to play in Liga 2 in the 2019 season. Camara made 1 league appearance and did not score a goal for Martapura.

References

External links
 Fassawa Camara at Soccerway
 Fassawa Camara at ligaindonesiabaru.com

1983 births
Association football midfielders
Guinean expatriate footballers
Guinean expatriate sportspeople in Indonesia
Guinean footballers
Expatriate footballers in Indonesia
Indonesian Premier League players
Living people
Persebaya Surabaya players
Naturalised citizens of Indonesia
Indonesian people of Guinean descent